KGUM-FM (105.1 FM) is a radio station licensed to Hagåtña, a village in the United States territory of Guam. Owned by Sorensen Media Group, the station broadcasts a AC format branded as 105 The KAT.

History 
The station hit the airwaves at 3 PM on June 4, 1999, where it broadcast an active rock format as 105.1 The Rock until September 2007. The new branded station as 105.1 The Kat from 2007 to 2016, and offered a classic hit that focused on 1970s’, 1980s’, and 1990s’ music. In January 2016, the station switch to its former Hot AC format with the slogan known as "Hits of the 90s and New Millennium", then in February 2017 it was introduced the new name as 105.1 KAT FM. On January 18, 2021, the station reverted to its current classic hits for the 70s, 80s and 90s music. On October 7, 2021, it was introduced the new name as 105.1 Solid Radio. On February 5, 2022, the station switch to AC format and reverted to 105 The KAT.

DJs

Current 
 Leo Payumo
 Bronson

Former 
 Lord Chris Berg
 Pauly X Suba
 Charlie "Mama Char" Catbagan
 Louise B. Muna

Programming

Current 
 Leo in the Morning (2021–present)
 Bronson's Choice (2016–2017, 2019–present)

Former 
 The Pauly Experience (2016–2021)
 The Mama Char Show (2019–2020)
 RY-FI Fire Show (2018–2019)
 The Afternoon Goon with Lord Chris Berg (2017–2019)

External links

GUM-FM
Classic hits radio stations in the United States
1999 establishments in Guam
Radio stations established in 1999
Hagåtña, Guam